The Church of St Michael and All Angels is the former parish church of Gwernesney, Monmouthshire, Wales.  It is a Grade I listed building. In 2017, the church was vested in the care of the Friends of Friendless Churches.

History and architecture

The church is thirteenth century in origin but with much fifteenth-century work.  The double bell gable, and more, was restored in 1853–4 by John Pollard Seddon. It is of Old Red Sandstone.

The interior contains a late medieval screen, "of particular interest."  The church register of baptisms and burials dates from the year 1758 and that of marriages from 1757.

Notes

References
 

Gwernesney
Church in Wales church buildings